The 4th World Congress of the Communist International was an assembly of delegates to the Communist International held in Petrograd and Moscow, Soviet Russia, between November 5 and December 5, 1922. A total of 343 voting delegates from 58 countries were in attendance. The 4th World Congress is best remembered for having amplified the tactic of the United Front into a fundamental part of international Communist policy. The gathering also elected a new set of leaders to the Comintern's governing body, the Executive Committee of the Communist International (ECCI).

History

Historical background
The 4th World Congress of the Comintern was convened on November 5, 1922 — just days after Benito Mussolini's March on Rome that effectively seized power for his National Fascist Party. The revolutionary upsurge which had swept Europe during the years immediately following the termination of World War I was clearly in full retreat and the international Communist movement saw itself in need for accommodation to this changed political environment.

With the prospects for immediate revolution in the industrialized countries of Western Europe fading, the defense of the regime in Soviet Russia had rapidly come to be seen as the chief priority of the Communist movement. Owing to the failure of revolution in Finland, Germany, Hungary, and elsewhere, the stature of the Communist Party of Russia was enhanced relative to other Communist Parties of the world, and tendencies towards centralization and Russian dominance were thereby accelerated.

Convocation
The 4th World Congress was attended by 343 voting delegates from 58 different countries. An additional 65 delegates were present with the right to speak but not to vote, and another 6 were admitted as guests. The gathering was the last congress of the Comintern attended by Soviet leader V.I. Lenin, who was too ill to attend any regular sessions and only appeared to deliver a single speech.

The Congress opened at 9 pm in the People's House in Petrograd, called to order by Clara Zetkin of Germany, who noted the fifth anniversary of the October Revolution of 1917. An honorary 13 member Presidium of the Congress — chosen in advance by ECCI in consultation with important national parties — was unanimously elected as the first order of business.

Factional turmoil
The World Congress, as the highest decision-making authority of the Communist International, was marked by the bitter factional battles of various member parties, with each group seeking final decision in favor of its policies and positions. Chief among these was the battle among the delegates of the Communist Party of America, split into two hostile factional groups. The battle spilled into the nominations for the American seat on the governing Executive Committee of the Communist International, with American Otto Huiswoud protesting the nomination of C.E. Ruthenberg for this position, arguing that he had himself been selected for the spot by the American delegation. Huiswoud's protest was to no avail as the new Executive was proposed as a single slate of pre-determined names, all amendments were rejected, and the list of candidates was approved en bloc.

Policy of the United Front 
Paying considerable attention to the growth of the fascist danger (in connection with the establishment of the fascist dictatorship in Italy), the Congress emphasized that the main means of combating fascism was the tactics of the united workers' front. To rally the broad masses of working people, who were not yet ready to fight for the dictatorship of the proletariat, but were already capable of fighting for economic and political rights against the bourgeoisie, the slogan of a “workers' government” was put forward (later the slogan of a workers' and peasants' government). While the tactic of the United Front was first adopted by ECCI in December 1921, the 4th World Congress is remembered to history for having extended and further institutionalized the tactic.

Presidium of the 4th World Congress
Members of the presidium were:

 Émile Béron (France)
 Arthur Henriet (France)
 Sen Katayama (Japan)
 Ludwig Katterfeld (USA)
 Vasil Kolarov (Bulgaria)
 Jack V. Leckie (Great Britain)
 V.I. Lenin (Soviet Russia)
 Andrea Marabini (Italy)
 Alois Neurath (Czechoslovakia)
 Olav Scheflo (Norway)
 Leon Trotsky (Soviet Russia)
 Adolf Warszawski (Poland)
 Clara Zetkin (Germany)

Speakers at the 4th World Congress

References

Further reading
 Alan Adler (ed.), Theses, Resolutions and Manifestos of the First Four Congresses of the Third International. Alix Holt and Barbara Holland, trans. London: Ink Links, 1980.

1922 in politics
Comintern
1922 in Russia
1922 conferences